D227 is a state road in Međimurje region of Croatia connecting Štrigova to D209 state road in Šenkovec near Čakovec. The northern terminus of the road is located at Banfi border crossing, providing access to Slovenian town of Ljutomer.
The road, as well as all other state roads in Croatia, is managed and maintained by Hrvatske ceste, state owned company.

Road junctions and populated areas

Maps

References

State roads in Croatia
Međimurje County